Andrew Harrison OBE is a British chemist and a research manager. From 1978 he studied chemistry at Oxford University, where he graduated as PhD in 1985. Then he worked as a researcher in Britain, Canada and France. In October 2020 he became an Officer of the Order of the British Empire.

Career 
Harrison's work is focused on chemistry.
09/1985 - 12/1988: Junior Research Fellow at St. John's College, Oxford
01-12/1988 - Research Fellow at McMaster University
01/1989 - 12/1991: Royal Society Research Fellow at Oxford University
01/1992 - 07/2006: University of Edinburgh, from 2000 Professor of Solid-state chemistry, from 2001 Founding Director of the Centre for Science at Extreme Conditions
08/2006 - 12/2013: Associate Director, from 2011 Director-General of Institut Laue-Langevin at Grenoble, France
01/2013 - 10/2022 CEO of Diamond Light Source, UK
from 11/2022 - Director of Science at Extreme Light Infrastructure
According to St. John's College, Harrison is one of the most successful British research managers. Besides the COVID-19 related research, his focus is to design new batteries and to improve the plastic recycling with an efficient plastic degrading enzyme.

See also 
Diamond Light Source
Institut Laue–Langevin

References 

Alumni of St John's College, Oxford
Fellows of St John's College, Oxford
Academics of the University of Edinburgh
Officers of the Order of the British Empire
Living people
Year of birth missing (living people)